Granichak is a village in Vidin Province in northwestern Bulgaria. It is located in the municipality of Belogradchik.

Points of interest
 Anishte, a Roman road station, is located two kilometers east of Granichak. It dates back to the 2nd and 3rd century.  Eighty hectares have been protected around it.  Lamps, ceramics, belt buckles and coins have been found there.  
 Vedernik, a mountain of 1,125 meters in elevation.

References

Sources
 Michev Nicholas & Peter Koledarov. "Dictionary of settlements and settlement names in Bulgaria 1878-1987", Sofia, 1989.

External links
 Vidin-online

Villages in Vidin Province
Belogradchik Municipality